The men's freestyle 120 kilograms is a competition featured at the 2013 World Wrestling Championships, and was held at the László Papp Budapest Sports Arena in Budapest, Hungary on 17 September 2013.

This freestyle wrestling competition consists of a single-elimination tournament, with a repechage used to determine the winner of two bronze medals.

Results
Legend
C — Won by 3 cautions given to the opponent
F — Won by fall
R — Retired

Final

Top half

Bottom half

Repechage

References
Results Book, Page 30

Men's freestyle 99 kg